Daniel Colin (30 September 1933 – 15 June 2019) was a French politician who was a deputy from 1986 to 1997.

References

1933 births
2019 deaths
Politicians from Paris
Deputies of the 8th National Assembly of the French Fifth Republic
Deputies of the 9th National Assembly of the French Fifth Republic
Deputies of the 10th National Assembly of the French Fifth Republic
Democratic Force (France) politicians
Union for French Democracy politicians
Members of Parliament for Var